Antiquity is an album by saxophonist Jackie McLean and percussionist Michael Carvin recorded in 1974 and released on the SteepleChase label.

Reception
The Allmusic review by Scott Yanow stated "This is a unique project in the discography of Jackie McLean, and is well worth a few close listens".

Track listing
 All compositions by Jackie McLean except where noted.
 "The Tob" – 4:10		
 "Antiquity: The Hump" – 6:15		
 "Antiquity: The Slaveship" – 3:08		
 "Antiquity: The Hunter and His Game" (Billy Skinner) – 5:09		
 "Antiquity: The Crossing" – 2:47		
 "Gong Go Lye" – 3:11		
 "Ti Ti" (Michael Carvin) – 8:38		
 "Down in the Bottom" – 4:08
 "Deicomahleeah" (Carvin) – 11:42

Personnel
Jackie McLean – alto saxophone, piano, vocals, bamboo flute, bells, temple block, percussion
Michael Carvin – drums, vocals, temple block, bells, bamboo flute, kalimba, percussion

References

SteepleChase Records albums
Jackie McLean albums
Michael Carvin albums
1975 albums